Lebua at State Tower is an all-suite luxury hotel occupying the 21st to 25th floors of State Tower adjacent to the Chao Phraya River on Silom Road in the Bang Rak District of Bangkok, Thailand. The hotel is managed by Lebua Hotels & Resorts, which also manages Tower Club at Lebua, located in the same building, on the floors just above.

The brand is founded by its current Chief-Executive, Deepak Ohri.

The hotel's restaurants were featured in the 2011 film "The Hangover Part II".

Lebua State Tower's rooftop restaurant, Sirocco, hosts the highest New Year's Eve ball drop in the world – from the height of 266m (872 feet).

Features

 Bars and restaurant
The Dome at lebua - The roof of State Tower is adorned with a golden dome. In 2007, The Dome hosted the World’s Most Expensive Meal. The Dome features a collection of bars and restaurants:
Breeze offers Asian cuisine in al fresco setting and has been called one of the top 10 most cutting-edge restaurants.
Distil is a cocktail bar located on the 64th floor, offering oysters, caviar, lobster, cigars and a collection of single malt whiskey. It received a 2014 Certificate of Excellence from TripAdvisor.
Mezzaluna is on the 65th floor. It offers modern innovative cuisine and has been named one of Thailand’s best restaurants, Mezzaluna hosted one of the most expensive dinners in Thailand at one million baht per head in 2007. and one of the top 100 restaurants in the world.
Sirocco is the world’s highest al fresco restaurant and has been named one of Thailand’s best restaurants.
Sky Bar was named as one of the world's best rooftop bars.
Café Mozu is at poolside and is known for its breakfast buffet and offers international cuisine including Thai, Lebanese, Western, Indian and American deli. In 2014, it was awarded TripAdvisor's Certificate of Excellence.
Ocean 52 is a cocktail lounge on the 52nd floor that serves Asian and gourmet delicacies.
Business center
Conference and event venues
Fitness center
Spa
Swimming pool

Sirocco

Sirocco is a restaurant on the 63rd floor of the State Tower. The 150-cover restaurant opened in the winter of 2003. Its main feature is a 270° panorama of the Chao Phraya River and Bangkok. The restaurant is also owned and operated by lebua Hotels & Resorts. Sirocco was designed by global architectural and interior design firm, Design Worldwide Partnership with the design team led by executive director, Scott Whittaker.

Sirocco serves Mediterranean food and has a live band every evening.

Since New Year's Eve 2015, Sirocco has hosted the highest ball drop in the world  – from the height of 266m (872 feet).

Sky Bar

Sky Bar is the world’s highest open-air bar on the 64th floor (820 foot elevation) of the State Tower located on Silom Road, Bang Rak business district, Bangkok, Thailand, the second tallest building in Thailand. It features transparent walls for 360-degree views of the Chao Phraya River and the Bangkok skyline as well as an LED illuminated cylindrical bar that changes colors every 90 seconds.

Opened in 2003 and is also owned and operated by lebua Hotels & Resorts.

Fare
Sky Bar features experimental cocktails including “poptails” (a combination of a popsicle and a cocktail) and the “Hangovertini”, a strong green-hued blend of green tea liqueur, Martini Rosso, green apple juice, and rosemary-infused honey created for The Hangover Part II as well as vintage wine.

Tower Club at lebua

Tower Club at lebua is an all-suite luxury hotel occupying the 51st to 59th floors and also managed by lebua Hotels & Resorts. Tower Club is the more exclusive and private than Lebua at State Tower.

Awards
In 2013, lebua at State Tower received the Agoda.com "Gold Circle Award". In 2015, the hotel won he Best International Hotel for Business Travel in Thailand at the annual Condé Nast Traveler Readers' Choice Awards. The hotel has been recognized by the World Travel Awards as the world's leading lifestyle and luxury all Suite hotel.

In 2014, The Tower Club at lebua received the "World's Leading Luxury All-Suite Hotel Award" from The World Travel Awards. In 2012, the hotel was awarded "World's Leading Lifestyle Hotel Award" from the same organization.

In popular culture
The hotel, Sirocco, Sky Bar, Tower Club and the State Tower were sites of several key scenes in the 2011 film The Hangover Part II.

The hotel features a three-bedroom "Hangover" suite where the cast of the film created havoc. Sky Bar created the "Hangovertini", a cocktail to commemorate the film. The cocktail was first served to director Todd Phillips.

References

External links

Sirocco
Sirocco Reservations
 Sky Bar

Hotels in Bangkok
Bang Rak district
Hotels established in 2003
2003 establishments in Thailand